Shahid Nawaz (born 26 August 1970) is a Pakistani former cricketer. He played 104 first-class matches in Pakistan between 1987 and 2000. He was also part of Pakistan's squad for the 1988 Youth Cricket World Cup.

References

External links
 

1970 births
Living people
Pakistani cricketers
Faisalabad cricketers
Habib Bank Limited cricketers
Lahore cricketers
Pakistan Automobiles Corporation cricketers
Cricketers from Lahore